Stéphanie Dechand (born 4 January 1985) is a French rower. She competed in the women's coxless pair event at the 2008 Summer Olympics.

References

1985 births
Living people
French female rowers
Olympic rowers of France
Rowers at the 2008 Summer Olympics
People from Saint-Pol-sur-Mer
Sportspeople from Nord (French department)
20th-century French women
21st-century French women